Sacramento Airport may refer to:

Airports in Sacramento, California, United States:
 Sacramento International Airport (FAA: SMF)
 Sacramento Executive Airport (FAA: SAC)
 Sacramento Mather Airport (FAA: MHR)
 McClellan Airfield (FAA: MCC)

Airports in other places named Sacramento:
 Sacramento Airport (Brazil) in Sacramento, Minas Gerais, Brazil (ICAO: SNJW or SNSC)